Kosova is a village in Põlva Parish, Põlva County, Estonia.

References

Villages in Põlva County